Rainer Dietel (15 April 1937 – 12 May 2021) was a German skier. He competed in the Nordic combined events at the 1960 Winter Olympics and the 1964 Winter Olympics.

References

External links 
 

1937 births
2021 deaths
German male Nordic combined skiers
Olympic Nordic combined skiers of the United Team of Germany
Nordic combined skiers at the 1960 Winter Olympics
Nordic combined skiers at the 1964 Winter Olympics
People from Mittelsachsen
Sportspeople from Saxony